Vicious Vinyl is a record label based in Melbourne, Australia. The label was started in the late 1980s in Frankston by aspirant producer/DJs, Andy Van and John Course. Colin Daniels later joined as their third partner.

Vicious Recordings was founded in 1992, and has featured artists such as Avicii, Dirty South, Madison Avenue, Peking Duk, and The Potbelleez.

They released a number of local artists including Ground Level, Bubbleman and Pendulum to major club scene acclaim. The label garnered major international success with the Vicious Grooves release of Andy Van's Madison Avenue project and their single, "Don't Call Me Baby".

Labels under Vicious

 Zip Music
 Vicious Vinyl
 Vicious Recordings
 Vicious Grooves
 Vicious Urban
 Vicious Bitch
 Vicious Black
 Be Rich Records

See also

List of record labels

References

External links
Vicious Vinyl website

Australian record labels
Electronic dance music record labels
Record labels based in Melbourne